The Basilica of the National Shrine of the Assumption of the Blessed Virgin Mary, also called the Baltimore Basilica, was the first Roman Catholic cathedral built in the United States, and was among the first major religious buildings constructed in the nation after the adoption of the U.S. Constitution.  As a co-cathedral, it is one of the seats of the Catholic Archdiocese in Baltimore, Maryland. Additionally it is a parish church (ranked minor basilica) and national shrine. It is considered the masterpiece of Benjamin Henry Latrobe, the "Father of American Architecture".

History
The Basilica was constructed between 1806 and 1863 to a design of Benjamin Henry Latrobe, America's first professionally trained architect and Thomas Jefferson's Architect of the U.S. Capitol. It was built under the guidance of the first American bishop of the Roman Catholic Church, John Carroll.  The Basilica was blessed and opened for use on May 31, 1821, by the third Archbishop of Baltimore, Ambrose Maréchal. It was consecrated on May 25, 1876, by Archbishop James Roosevelt Bayley.

Many famous events have occurred within its walls, including the funeral Mass of Charles Carroll of Carrollton, the only Catholic signatory of the Declaration of Independence. Carroll had been the last of the surviving signers.  Most of the first American bishops were consecrated here to fill the ever-multiplying dioceses necessitated by the young country's territorial expansion and the great growth of the American Catholic population. Until recent years, more priests were ordained at the Baltimore Basilica than in any other church in the United States.

The building hosted many of the 19th century meetings that shaped the Catholic Church in America, including seven Provincial Councils and three Plenary Councils. Among other effects, these led to the founding of The Catholic University of America and efforts to evangelize African and Native Americans to Catholicism. The Third Plenary Council, which was the largest meeting of Catholic bishops held outside Rome since the Council of Trent, commissioned the Baltimore Catechism.

In 1862, while in Maryland during the Civil War's Peninsula campaign, Union General Joseph Warren Revere (grandson of Paul Revere) visited the Basilica. General Revere was compelled to convert to Catholicism, and he did so despite the ongoing war. On October 19, 1862, Reverend H. B. Coskery baptized Revere at the Basilica. Revere's Holy Communion took place on October 26.

In 1937, Pope Pius XI raised the cathedral to the rank of Minor Basilica. It was listed on the National Register of Historic Places in 1969, and two years later was declared a National Historic Landmark. In 1993, the United States Conference of Catholic Bishops designated the Basilica as a National Shrine.

The Cathedral Hill Historic District takes its name from the Basilica's location.

Many people deemed holy by the Catholic Church are associated with the Basilica, including the Servant of God Mother Mary Lange, Foundress of the Oblate Sisters of Providence, the first order for Catholic nuns of African-American descent; the Blessed Father Michael J. McGivney, founder of the Knights of Columbus, who was ordained at the Basilica in 1877 by Archbishop James Gibbons; and St. John Neumann, who is credited with founding America's Catholic school system.

The Basilica has welcomed millions of visitors, including Pope John Paul II in 1995, Mother Teresa in 1996, and Ecumenical Patriarch Bartholomew I of Constantinople in 1997. The building has also been visited by at least 20 other saints or potential saints.

Archbishop William E. Lori, Archbishop of Baltimore, celebrated the 200th anniversary of the dedication of the Baltimore Basilica on May 31, 2021.

Architecture

The cathedral is a monumental neoclassical-style building designed in conformity to a Latin cross basilica plan — a departure on Latrobe's part from previous American church architecture, but in keeping with longstanding European traditions of cathedral design. The plan unites two distinct elements: a domed space and a longitudinal axis.

Exterior

The main façade is a classical Greek portico with Ionic columns arranged in double hexastyle pattern, immediately behind which rise a pair of cylindrical towers. Architectural historian Henry-Russell Hitchcock believed that the onion-shaped domes atop the two towers were “not of Latrobe's design,” but now it is believed that they "were entirely the architect's own."  The exterior walls are constructed of silver-gray gneiss quarried from the Ellicott City Granodiorite.

Dome

Latrobe originally planned a masonry dome with a lantern on top, but his friend Thomas Jefferson suggested a wooden double-shell dome (of a type pioneered by French master builder Philibert Delorme) with 24 half-visible skylights. For the inner dome Latrobe created a solid, classically detailed masonry hemisphere. Grids of plaster rosettes adorn its coffered ceiling.

Interior
The interior is occupied by a massive dome at the crossing of the Latin cross plan, creating a centralizing effect which contrasts the exterior impression of a linear or oblong building. Surrounding the main dome is a sophisticated system of barrel vaults and shallow, saucer-like secondary domes. The light-filled interior designed by Latrobe was striking in contrast to the dark, cavernous recesses of traditional Gothic cathedrals.

The Basilica houses many precious works of art, including two heroic portraits:  the first entitled Descent from the Cross by Pierre-Narcisse Guérin and the second, by Baron Charles de Steuben, depicts Louis IX of France burying his plague-stricken troops before the siege of Tunis at the beginning of the Eighth Crusade in 1270. Both portraits were gifts of King Louis XVIII of France shortly after the 1821 opening of the Basilica.

21st-century restoration

A 32-month, $34 million restoration project was completed in 2006. The restoration included a total incorporation of modern systems throughout the building, while also restoring the interior to Latrobe's original design. Many "misguided accretions" were corrected. The original wall colors (pale yellow, blue, and rose) were restored, as was the light-colored marble flooring which for decades had been a dark green color. Twenty-four skylights in the main dome were re-opened, and the stained glass windows (installed in the 1940s) were given to St. Louis parish in Clarksville (whose new church was designed around them) and replaced with clear glass windows.

Additionally, the Basilica's crypt was made accessible to the public, as well as the expansive masonry undercroft (basement) of the church. The undercroft, until 2006, had been filled with sand from the original building of the cathedral, which prevented Carroll and Latrobe's vision of a Chapel in the undercroft. During the restoration, the tons of sand were removed, and the Our Lady Seat of Wisdom Chapel was finally realized.

Cardinal William Keeler, then Archbishop of Baltimore, and one of the many champions of the restoration project, completed the restoration without dipping into the coffers of the Archdiocese, instead using private funds donated for the sole purpose of the restoration. The Basilica was closed to the public from November 2004 through November 2006, reopening in time for the Basilica's Bicentennial and the biannual meeting of the United States Conference of Catholic Bishops, which was held in Baltimore to mark the occasion.

2011 earthquake 
On August 23, 2011, an earthquake that jolted the East Coast from Georgia to Quebec rattled through the Basilica, sending nearly 1,000 linear feet of cracks through its ceilings and walls. A seven-month, $3 million restoration was completed on Easter Sunday 2012.

Notable interments
Nine of the fourteen deceased Archbishops of Baltimore have been laid to rest in the Basilica's historic crypt.  The crypt is located beneath the main altar, next to the Our Lady Seat of Wisdom Chapel, and is accessible to the public.  Resting in the crypt are:

 John Carroll, S.J., first Bishop of the United States; Archbishop of Baltimore: November 6, 1789 — December 3, 1815
 Ambrose Maréchal, S.S., third Archbishop of Baltimore: July 4, 1817 – January 29, 1828
 James Whitfield, fourth Archbishop of Baltimore: January 29, 1828 – October 19, 1834
 Samuel Eccleston, P.S.S., fifth Archbishop of Baltimore: October 19, 1834 — April 22, 1851
 Francis Patrick Kenrick, sixth Archbishop of Baltimore: August 19, 1851 — July 8, 1863
 Martin John Spalding, seventh Archbishop of Baltimore: May 6, 1864 — February 7, 1872
 James Cardinal Gibbons, ninth Archbishop of Baltimore: October 3, 1877 — March 24, 1921
 Michael Joseph Curley, tenth Archbishop of Baltimore: August 10, 1921 — May 16, 1947 and first Archbishop of Washington: July 22, 1939 — May 16, 1947
William Cardinal Keeler, fourteenth Archbishop of Baltimore: May 23, 1983 — July 12, 2007

Historic designations
The Basilica of the Assumption was listed on the National Register of Historic Places on October 1, 1969, and was made a National Historic Landmark in November 1971. It is the centerpiece of the Cathedral Hill Historic District. The basilica is within Baltimore National Heritage Area.

See also

List of churches in the Roman Catholic Archdiocese of Baltimore
List of Catholic cathedrals in the United States
List of cathedrals in the United States
Top Catholic pilgrimage destinations in the US

Notes

References

Additional sources

External links

 Official Cathedral Site
 Roman Catholic Archdiocese of Baltimore Official Site
 National Historic Landmark Listing
 Basilica of the National Shrine of the Assumption: Photo Gallery by The Catholic Photographer
, including undated photo, at Maryland Historical Trust

Baltimore National Heritage Area
Assumption of the Blessed Virgin Mary, Basilica of the National Shrine
Assumption of the Blessed Virgin Mary, Basilica of the National Shrine
History of Baltimore
Assumption of the Blessed Virgin Mary, Basilica of the National Shrine
Assumption of the Blessed Virgin Mary, Basilica of the National Shrine
Churches on the National Register of Historic Places in Maryland
Roman Catholic churches completed in 1821
Assumption of the Blessed Virgin Mary, Basilica of the National Shrine of the
Assumption of the Blessed Virgin Mary, Basilica of the National Shrine
Assumption of the Blessed Virgin Mary, Basilica of the National Shrine
Church buildings with domes
19th-century Roman Catholic church buildings in the United States
Downtown Baltimore
Benjamin Henry Latrobe church buildings
Properties of religious function on the National Register of Historic Places in Baltimore
Minor basilicas in the United States
Baltimore City Landmarks